Dato Sri Haji Abdul Karim Rahman Hamzah (Jawi: عبد الكريم الرحمن حمزة; born 15 May 1960), is a Malaysian politician based in the state of Sarawak from the Parti Pesaka Bumiputera Bersatu (PBB), a major component party of the ruling Gabungan Parti Sarawak (GPS) coalition of the state. He has served as State Minister of Tourism, Arts, Culture, Youth and Sports of Sarawak since May 2017. He served as the State Assistant Minister of Youth and Sports of Sarawak from January 2017 to May 2017 and State Assistant Minister of Housing and Youth Development of Sarawak from September 2011 to January 2017. He has also served as the Member of the Sarawak State Legislative Assembly (MLA) for Asajaya since September 2001.

Political career
Abdul Karim was first appointed as Assistant Minister for Housing and Youth Development after successfully defending his seat and becoming a three-term MLA in 2011.

In May 2017, Abdul Karim was promoted to full minister by the sixth Chief Minister of Sarawak Abang Abdul Rahman Zohari Abang Openg to head the Ministry of Tourism, Art, Culture, Youth and Sports.

Election results

Honours
  :
  Knight Commander of the Most Exalted Order of the Star of Sarawak (PNBS) – Dato Sri (2021)
  Commander of the Order of the Star of Hornbill Sarawak (PGBK) – Datuk (2013)

See also
 Asajaya (state constituency)

References

21st-century Malaysian politicians
Living people
20th-century Malaysian lawyers
Knights Commander of the Most Exalted Order of the Star of Sarawak
Commanders of the Order of the Star of Hornbill Sarawak
1960 births
People from Kuching
People from Sarawak
Malaysian people of Malay descent
Malaysian Muslims
Sarawak politicians
Sarawak state ministers
Members of the Sarawak State Legislative Assembly
Parti Pesaka Bumiputera Bersatu politicians